The 1981 French motorcycle Grand Prix was the fifth round of the 1981 Grand Prix motorcycle racing season. It took place on the weekend of 16–17 May 1981 at the Paul Ricard Circuit.

Classification

500 cc

References

French motorcycle Grand Prix
French
Motorcycle Grand Prix